Germigney may refer to:
Germigney, Jura, a commune in the French region of Franche-Comté
Germigney, Haute-Saône, a commune in the French region of Franche-Comté